Andrew Van Buren is a British multi skilled performer, illusionist, plate spinner and showman who specialises in presenting large-scale illusions, plate spinning routines, magic, juggling and circus style skills in all type of performance venues.

Biography
Andrew Van Buren spent his childhood touring the world with his parents' Fred Van Buren and Greta's magic and illusion show. Having been taken on stage for the first time at just six weeks old, he learned his trade growing up in theatres and circus, on-stage, off-stage and backstage as well as gaining experience in fairgrounds and on multiple television and film sets. During this time he teamed up with a Hungarian State Circus artiste who taught him the art of trick cycling, which led to his performing unicycling, juggling and plate spinning with real breakable plates.

Andrew now tours his own shows and specialises in theatre, corporate and cabaret settings, cruise liners, television and outdoor events. Other than in a performer capacity he is also associated with and runs several ongoing parallel entertainment industry based projects.

Andrew has a daughter with his long time partner and stage assistant Allyson Ford.

Key Past Venues and Projects 
Van Buren and his team have performed around the world, notably at the Brit Awards in the London Arena, the 2002 Commonwealth Games and before members of the British Royal family at World Expo in Seville, Spain. He has regularly performed with and made appear, disappear and float in mid-air the cast of British soap opera Coronation Street, comedian Peter Kay and Lulu. He has worked in British venues including The Royal Albert Hall and Wembley Arena in London, as well as regularly performing on international cruise ships and regularly presenting shows in the United Arab Emirates. Andrew also has advised in the television and film industry, for resident shows, bespoke productions and theatre tours, including for The Royal Shakespeare Company.

On 8 September 2011 Van Buren presented the opening show of the New Mitchell Arts theatre in his home area of Hanley Stoke-on-Trent England - the first theatre stage he worked on as a child solo performer, returning 30 years later to present one of his illusion shows as the launch of the new £4 million refit venue.

During 2013 amongst other projects Van Buren rescued and worked as Magic consultant, stagecraft choreographer and adviser on the show Houdini, which toured theatres in the UK - written by and starring BAFTA winning actor, writer, director and producer Stuart Brennan, with Jamie Nichols as Houdini and the Harry Potter Film actress Evanna Lynch as Bess Houdini, the play received strong reviews with The Stage Newspaper referred to the play as "a delicious piece of theatre that combines great drama with a generous helping of tricks and illusions".

The Early Years
After touring with his parents shows Andrew headed off performing on his own at a young age. He started off at the bottom of the showbusiness ladder working in nightclubs, raves and clubs, until he got the break into a new level of show, he was asked to represent Great Britain at World Expo before Prince Charles and Diana Princess of Wales. From this point Andrew was offered a nine and a half week tour with Music Hall Legend Danny La Rue, the nine and a half weeks ended up nearly three years touring the biggest UK theatres with the Danny La Rue show. From this new theatre tours and Summer Season shows poured in, allowing Andrew to work alongside veteran theatre and television stars of the time, including John Inman, Little and Large, Cannon and Ball, Hinge and Bracket, The Nolan Sisters, Jimmy Cricket, Ray Alan and Lord Charles, Paul Daniels, plus from the pop music industry Bucks Fizz, Erasure and many more. These shows paved the way for Andrew to upscale his own shows to a grander scale and in new directions. Seeing that there were less traditional variety shows and summer season shows, Andrew headed into corporate events with his plate spinning, working for large global companies at their conventions, conferences and meetings, often alongside the companies CEOs, also then touring his own themed magic and illusion shows, often combined with his circus skills.

21st Century Magic Illusion Show spectaculars
Andrew Van Buren presented a large-scale magic illusion show called Van Buren's Abracadabra Magic Around The World in Blackpool Tower Circus during the 2007 season supported by a cast of 24 international performers and numerous large-scale illusions themed to a journey around the world. Van Buren and his team have also made regular appearances in the Middle East - UAE, Dubai, Doha, Sharjah, etc. with their themed magic illusions and circus skills mixed into their shows, as well as regular performances on some of the world's largest luxury cruise liners.

In partnership with Gandey World Class Productions in 2013 Van Buren & Gandeys launched The Victorian Wonders Carnival Show - The tented show description is "a mixture of Victorian Steampunk wonders mixed with elements of a theatrical play, sideshows and a large-scale magic and illusion show with the showmanship of the fairground". Its first performance was at the Brighton Festival before launching it on its still ongoing world tour, currently based in the Middle East and Far East as well as touring with Cirque Surreal.

Alongside "Van Buren & Gandeys touring Victorian Wonders Carnival", Andrew and Allyson are currently themselves personally touring the UK with their Outdoor arena show - "Van Buren's Victorian Wonders Show" performed at fetes, carnivals, festivals, Rallies, agricultural and all forms of outdoor event. This show is performed from their touring Art Nouveau theatre stage.

Affiliations
The Magic Circle - Andrew is one of only a few Gold Star members of The Inner Magic Circle - Andrew Van Buren MIMC.

Equity Andrew is a long standing member of Equity The Actors union.

"Association of Independent Showmen" (AIS) - Andrew is a member of the fairground outdoor events industry body the Association of Independent Showmen.

Grand Order of Water Rats - Andrew Van Buren is a long-standing member of the Theatrical showbusiness charity organisation The Grand Order of Water Rats.

Allyson is a member of the Grand Order of Lady Ratlings.

"Big Top Label" Rating System for European Circus. Andrew is a Committee Member of The Big Top Label, the Michelin star of circus arts, an independent quality assurance system guaranteeing quality circus art and no maltreatment of animals. Created by Mr. István Ujhelyi, Member of the European Parliament.

"The Philip Astley Project". Andrew is Director of The Philip Astley Project.

Andrew also advises and sits on the council and committees of several event organising groups and organisations.

The Philip Astley Project
Alongside running the Van Buren Organisation and his other projects Andrew is continuing an on going quest to gain the inventor of the modern circus Philip Astley greater recognition, which was started in 1981 when Andrew's father Fred Van Buren helped to create and themed Philip Astley / Circus the Newcastle-under-Lyme carnival in the UK.

Philip Astley was born in Newcastle-under-Lyme UK, which gives an even greater location connection for Andrew. In 1992 Andrew commissioned a portable life size statue to be made of Philip Astley, then alongside his father they created and developed a Summer of Astley events celebrating the 250th anniversary of Philip Astley's Birth. Over the years Andrew has become an expert on the life & legacy of the "original ringmaster" Philip Astley.

In 2009 Andrew Van Buren started a third personal attempt to not only raise awareness in Philip Astley and his legacy but also attempting to give Newcastle-under-Lyme a unique selling point to create tourism, this resulted in Andrew Van Buren and Cllr Wenslie Naylon creating the Philip Astley Project. Andrew is Director "Ringmaster".

The Philip Astley Project working committee alongside Cllr Wenslie Naylon and Andrew includes: Appetite, The Brampton Museum, The Friends of Brampton Museum, Keele university, Staffordshire University, Newcastle-under-Lyme Borough Council, Newcastle-under-Lyme Business Improvement District, Newcastle-under-Lyme Civic Society, Newcastle-under-Lyme College and Performing Arts Centre, New Vic Theatre, Staffordshire Film Archive, Staffordshire Libraries and Information Services, The Van Buren Organisation. Working together they are creating events, overseeing art installations, uniting archives, developing exhibitions and curating cultural and heritage links globally.

In 2017 The Philip Astley Project worked in conjunction with Manchester Metropolitan University and Federal University of Bahia (UFBA) Brazil to create the first Philip Astley & the Legacy of the Modern Circus Symposium.

During 2018 over 100 Astley events celebrated the 250th anniversary of the first modern circus. These included Andrew unveiling a plaque to Astley and the 250th anniversary of Modern Circus in Monte Carlo with Prince Albert II, Prince of Monaco and Princess Stéphanie of Monaco. During the anniversary year Andrew oversaw the unveiling of monuments in Newcastle-under-Lyme which generated news items and articles worldwide.

Andrew worked as adviser on the 2019 published hardback book The First Showman by New York Times Best Selling Author Karl Shaw, which tells the story of Philip Astley as well as Andrew's journey to gain Astley and his birthplace of Newcastle-under-Lyme recognition on the global map.

Illusionist and TV's Plate Spinner Television Appearances
Van Buren has appeared as the plate spinner, illusionist, and special guest on numerous television programmes including Chat Shows, Gameshows, News shows, TV specials and pop music videos.

Regular repeat appearances on BBC TV Blue Peter, the first Blue Peter appearance was broadcast live from World Expo in Seville Spain where Andrew was representing Great Britain performing for Prince Charles & Princess Diana. ITV Cilla Black's Moment of Truth, Ant & Dec's Saturday Night Takeaway, The Generation Game, CBBC’s children's variety show The Slammer. Plus appearances on Noel Edmonds' Telly Years, and CBBC Best of Friends, The Des O'Connor Show, "Every Home Should Have One" series, and BBC The Money Programme as the corporate businessman / magician / plate spinner in the "Enron Special", "The Banks that Robbed the World" and "Money Programme Special". He also appeared on the opening credits and all of the links for the 20 episode series Spin Cities alongside international DJ Judge Jules as well as repeat appearances on Dubai UAE and Sharjah UAE TV.

Advertising: Van Buren has provided many circus skills appearances for the City of Culture adverts, Habitat adverts, Senate Services, plus more recently provided pizza spinning for the superstore Morrisons ident adverts "Pizza spinner" either side of the Ant & Dec's Saturday Night Takeaway TV show.

Music Video's include Charlotte Church's song "Call My Name" and appearances on CD-UK.

In 2015, Andrew starred alongside Stephen Mulhern & Sherrie Hewson plate spinning on ITV variety show Get Your Act Together with American magicians Penn & Tellar, Singer - Songwriter Brian McFadden, glamour model Danielle Lloyd, Welsh rugby player Gareth Thomas, and singer Ray Quinn.

In January 2016 Andrew featured in an at the time ground breaking special 360 degree interactive film of BBC Breakfast News behind the studio scenes.

On 1 April 2018 Andrew and his assistant Allyson made a return appearance featured on the new version of BBC Generation Game with their Generation Game Show classic of the plate spinning with contestants smashing dozens of plates. The two episode show was hosted by Mel Giedroyc and Sue Perkins alongside Potters Wheel expert, comedian and actor Johnny Vegas plus Spandau Ballett's Martin Kemp.

Also during 2018 Andrew made repeated appearances on multiple TV and Radio News items around the world promoting the 250th anniversary of Modern Day Circus and its founder Philip Astley.

The 2018 World Juggling Tour film took covered twenty countries including Monaco, Russia, America, etc.

During 2019 Andrew Van Buren and Allyson were featured on the Channel 4 series Extreme Cake Makers which showed behind the scenes of the Van Buren Studio's as well as the creation of the Extreme Philip Astley Cake, commissioned by Andrew and created by award winning cake maker Suzanne Thorp of The Frostery. 

2022 Television appearances include Channel 4 Grand Designs and the 'Made with Love' marketing campaign for Summerill and Bishop.

Family History
The Van Buren Story, a documentary produced by Professor Ray Johnson MBE of Staffordshire Film Archive was released on DVD during 2010, with a new updated Directors Cut released in 2019.

Broadcast 13 November 2020 Andrew was interviewed by the 'Panto Podcast' online, in which he talked in depth about life growing up in show business, his families history, life behind the scenes and touring his shows.

External links & References
 Van Buren Entertainment Organisation official website
 Grand Order of Water Rats official website
 List of members of the GOWR
 Video of Van Buren plate spinning on the television game show Generation Game
 Video of Van Buren illusion show in Blackpool Tower circus
 Mitchell Theatre Opening News Item
 Mitchell Theatre Show
 A night at the Music Hall Tours
 Good Old Days Music Hall Tours
 Victorian Wonders Carnival - Brighton Argus News Item
 Manchester Evening News - Coronation Street Show
 Yorkshire Evening Post - Coronation Street Shows 
 The Alex Horne Section
 Commonwealth Games Manchester
 Time Out - Harry Hill
 The Philip Astley Project Launch & Statue
 Van Buren Organisation Partnership with the University of Bahia Brazil / Manchester Metropolitan University England 
 Resurrecting Philip Astley at the Science Museum London
 The Philip Astley Project
 The Big Top Label Rating System for European Circus
 The American Vaudeville Museum / University of Arizona - History of Vaudeville Article by Victoria Esposito
 Andrew Van Buren speaking in the Palace of Westminster London about Philip Astley, Newcastle-under-Lyme, Heritage & Culture 
 Cirque Surreal Quirki Sideshows Review 
 Radio Times - Mel & Sue's The Generation Game
 Extreme Cake Makers 
 Cultural Industry Magazine, Dea Birkett on Andrew Van Buren the driving force behind a town’s cultural revival
 Monte Carlo Philip Astley Plaque unveil
 The Times Raconteur Magazine Circus of the Soul Article
 The Independent - Philip Astley
 The Financial Times Masterclass Andrew Van Buren on Plate Spinning
 Ch4 Grand Designs with Kevin McCloud
 Summerill and Bishop Advertising Campaign
 Panto Podcast in-depth interview with Andrew Van Buren Broadcast 13th November 2020

Books

 Book - The Soundtrack to My Life By Dermot O'Leary
 Ancient Philosophy and Origin of the Universe
 Swedish Made Easy - The Plate Spinner metaphor
 Book - Adam's Rib Disorder: A Misconception of Submission By Deborah A. Cosio
 Book - Zo lukt het wel project management
 Philip Astley The First Showman by New York Times Best seller Karl Shaw

Year of birth missing (living people)
Living people
British magicians
People from Stoke-on-Trent